Udaya TV is an Indian Kannada language general entertainment pay television channel owned by Sun TV Network.
Udaya TV is telecast in several nations like India, some Gulf countries and the United States. Udaya TV was Launched on 1 June 1994.

History
Udaya TV was incorporated on 1 June 1994 as a private limited company engaged in television broadcasting with a registered office at Chennai, Tamil Nadu. It was launched by the chairman of Sun TV, Kalanidhi Maran, and it started broadcasting from 1 June 1994. It was the first Kannada satellite channel to go on air.

It grew rapidly and by May 2000, Udaya TV has captured 70% of ad spending on TV in the state of Karnataka.  In 2000 and 2001, it won the Indian Television Academy's award for the best Kannada TV channel for 2001 It forayed into FM radio broadcasting by launching Vishaka FM, an FM channel in Visakhapatnam. It was a free-on-air channel until 1 August 2004, when it was made a pay channel with a subscription fee of Rs.18.

In February 2006, the directors of Udaya TV were Kalanidhi Maran, S. Selvam and Kaveri Kalanidhi. S. Selvam was also the Director of the Bangalore Bureau of Udaya TV. In November 2006, its owner Kalanithi Maran merged Udaya TV Ltd. with Sun TV Network along with Gemini TV Ltd for IPO listing of Sun TV Network.

Programming

Channels

Awards
 Indian Television Academy's award for the best Kannada TV channel for 2001
 Indian Television Academy's award for the best Kannada TV channel for 2002

See also
List of Kannada-language television channels
Television in India
Media in Karnataka
Media of India

References

External links

Kannada-language television channels
Television channels and stations established in 1994
Sun Group
Television stations in Bangalore
1994 establishments in Karnataka